Ben Yehuda Street may refer to:

 Ben Yehuda Street, Jerusalem
 Ben Yehuda Street, Tel Aviv
 Ben Yehuda Street, Haifa
 Ben Yehuda Street, Kfar Saba